Paginula is an extinct genus of oldfieldthomasiid notoungulate. It lived during the Eocene in what is now Argentina.

References

Typotheres
Eocene mammals of South America
Paleogene Argentina
Fossils of Argentina
Fossil taxa described in 1901
Taxa named by Florentino Ameghino
Prehistoric placental genera
Golfo San Jorge Basin
Sarmiento Formation